The 2018 ITF Women's Circuit – Baotou was a professional tennis tournament played on indoor clay courts. It was the first edition of the tournament and was part of the 2018 ITF Women's Circuit. It took place in Baotou, China, on 21–27 May 2018.

Singles main draw entrants

Seeds 

 1 Rankings as of 14 May 2018.

Other entrants 
The following players received a wildcard into the singles main draw:
  Ma Shuyue
  Ma Yexin
  Qi Jiatian
  Zhang Ying

The following players received entry from the qualifying draw:
  Feng Shuo
  Guo Meiqi
  Jiang Xinyu
  Wu Meixu

Champions

Singles

 Nina Stojanović def.  Xu Shilin, 6–0, 6–4

Doubles
 
 Alison Bai /  Aleksandrina Naydenova def.  Natalija Kostić /  Nika Kukharchuk, 6–4, 0–6, [10–6]

External links 
 2018 ITF Women's Circuit – Baotou at ITFtennis.com

2018 ITF Women's Circuit
2018 in Chinese tennis
Tennis tournaments in China